Cracroft Reserve is a  public reserve on Cracroft Hill in the Cashmere suburb of Christchurch, New Zealand. It is situated next to the Sign of the Takahe. Cracroft Reserve is a popular stop for tourists, and residents, with its viewing platform at  elevation providing panoramic views of Christchurch city, the Canterbury Plains, and the Southern Alps. The main entrance to the reserve is from the southern end of Hackthorne Road.

The reserve features a sturdy stainless steel plane table pointing to a wide range of landmarks visible from Cracroft Reserve, from Aoraki / Mount Cook to the south to Mount Tapuaenuku to the north. This sign, set on a Halswell stone base, was erected by the Rotary Club of Christchurch in 1967.

Cracroft Reserve is named after John Cracroft Wilson. Cracroft Wilson sold the property, once part of the larger Cashmere farm, to the city in about 1925, as part of prominent local politician Harry Ell's initiative to establish a network of reserves, rest houses, and tracks through the Christchurch Port Hills.

Notes

References

External links
 Species observed in Cracroft Reserve (iNaturallst NZ)

Parks in Christchurch
Tourist attractions in Christchurch
Protected areas of Canterbury, New Zealand
Landforms of Canterbury, New Zealand